Sri Guru Tegh Bahadur Khalsa College is a constituent college of the University of Delhi. It was established in 1951, and offers courses for science, commerce and arts in India. In 2018, the highest admission cut-off was 99.66 per cent for B.Sc. (Hons) in Electronics in SGTB Khalsa College. In the humanities stream, Khalsa College had set the highest cut-off at 99 per cent for BA (Hons) in Political Science.

The college has 59 classrooms, 19 labs, 6 research labs, indoor and outdoor sports facilities, gymnasium, cafeteria, bank, and medical facilities in proximity, besides other utility services such as post-office and market. The college is well connected by road and Delhi Metro link, and majority students are day-scholars. A hostel for girls can accommodate 147 students, and a hostel for boys was inaugurated in February 2021.

The college have air-conditioned classrooms with projection facilities and Internet, campus-wide wired as well as a wireless network having Internet connectivity, with 24x7 Internet in campus and an overall computer-student ratio of 1 : 2.95.

History

Sri Guru Tegh Bahadur Khalsa College, a constituent college of the University of Delhi, was established in 1951 and has been, since, maintained by Delhi Sikh Gurudwara Management Committee (DSGMC), a statutory body established under an act of the Parliament of India. The focus of the college at the time of inception was to ensure a comprehensive social transformation through access to quality education, in particular to young Punjabi refugees of partition in 1947, and to conserve and promote Punjabi language, culture, and heritage. The college is named after the Ninth Guru of Sikhism Sri Guru Tegh Bahadur, who sacrificed his life to uphold secular values and is an institution with the cosmopolitan environment and progressive outlook.
Khalsa College is a constituent of the University of Delhi. The college began in four rooms in a school in Dev Nagar with 49 students and a faculty of 6. It moved to its present location in 1973.

Academics

Academic programmes
At present, there are 18 undergraduate programmes, two B.Tech. programmes, 12 postgraduate programmes, one postgraduate diploma, two undergraduate diplomas, and 9 certificate courses, making a total of 44 programmes. As of the session 2015–16, there were 3,768 students in these programmes, and 140 full-time teachers, out of which 101 permanent. During last four years, 57 teachers participated in various staff-development programmes.
The college offers the following courses:
 B.A. (program)
 B.A. (Hons)
 B.A. (Hons) in Business Economics also known as B.B.E.
 B.Com.(Hons)
 B.Com. (Programme)
 B.Sc. (Hons) in Botany
 B.Sc. (Hons) in Chemistry
 B.Sc. (Hons) in Computer Science
 B.Sc. (Hons) in Electronics
 B.Sc. (Hons) in Mathematics
 B.Sc. (Hons) in Physics
 B.Sc. (Hons) in Zoology
 B.Sc. in Life Science
 B.Sc. in Physical Science
 PG Diploma Forensic Science
 Certificate Course in Web Journalism
 Certificate Course in Sports Economics and Marketing
 Certificate Courses in French, German, Spanish and Italian.

Academic work
The college has undertaken projects in the field of ciliate zoology and has reported new species of protozoans from Northeast India. It collaborates with the Natural History Museum, London and University of Camerino.

It offers a dual credential programs in collaboration with University of the Fraser Valley and Avans.

Sports
The college has a spacious playing field for hockey, cricket, and football, and facilities for indoor games like table tennis, carom, and chess, as well as a mini gymnasium. The Sant Harchand Singh Longowal Sports Complex consists of a gymnasium. A squash racket room, three table tennis rooms, and changing rooms for players are also in this complex. The college has a floodlit lawn tennis court.

Rankings 

It is ranked 30th across India by National Institutional Ranking Framework in 2020.

Placement
Apart from bringing a varied list of recruiters to the campus, the Placement Cell organises talks, study abroad seminars, internship opportunities and workshops for the collective student body. Training and Placement Cell of the college provides following facilities at the college premises.
 Conducting mock personal interviews and group discussions to make students aware of the selection procedures
 Summer industrial training, internship and final placement of students.
 Conducting industrial visits and industry-oriented training programmes.
 Invite professional guest speakers to impart necessary inputs for the above-mentioned activities.

Major recruiters 
Major companies visit the campus at the annual placement drive. Some of the major recruiters at Shri Guru Tegh Bahadur Khalsa College are as follows:
E&Y, KPMG, Deloitte, PWC, Zomato, SBI, Grant Thorton, TCS, Wipro, Tech Mahindra, IBM Daksh, Genpact, ICICI Prudential, S&P Global Market Intelligence, Protiviti and Housing.com.

Student life

College societies

Academic societies
 Curieux – The Computer Science Society: It was launched on 11th February, 2014 under the guidance of Mr. Param Dev Sharma. Curieux society is one of the Top Tech-Societies of University of Delhi. It equips students with the environment and expertise needed to succeed in this IT driven world. Curieux boasts of a competitive programming club as well which aims to encourage interest and instill skills in this field. 
 KHALSA STREET - The Finance and Investment Cell
 SPARKS-The Physics Society
 BA Program Society;Festival:Revel
 Catenation- The Chemistry Society
 Raah – the Business Economics society; festival: Perspica; society magazine: Bizonomist
 Comsoc- The Commerce Society; Festival: Comzone. 
The Business Café(TBC) is the editorial board of Department of Commerce. The department has its own line of bi-monthly e-business magazine, BizGeist. The inaugural edition of BizGeist was uncovered by Dr. Saudamini Das (NABARD Chair Professor at Indian Institute of Economic Growth). TBC also publishes the annual department magazine, Spectracom. 
 Ecotryst – economics society; festival: Convergence and Annual Economic Conclave; Society Magazine: E-Quest
 English Literary Society; festival: Arabesque
 Hindi Sahitya Sabha – the Hindi literary society; newspaper: Aagaaz
 Punjabi Literary Society
 Dāstaan – The History Society
 Aakriti – the zoology society
 Prakriti – botany society
 Polis- political science society, festival- Eudaimonia
 Aavritii – The Electronics society
Junto - The Civil Services Society
Enactus - Social Entrepreneurship Society
TradeX - A student Organization focusing on Trading related activities in stocks, commodities, crypto, and other disciplines.

The college magazine, The Tegh, consists of English, Hindi and Punjabi sections.

Co-curricular and extracurricular societies
 Connecting Dreams Foundation, Sgtb Khalsa Chapter-Social Entrepreneurship Society, Currently having 4 running projects : Project Sarvaangeen,Project Kilkari,Project Svashray and Project Ramyata.
 CHALCHITRA - The Filmmaking Society. It was founded in 2021 by Pradyumna Bawari, Divgunn Singh, Tushar Mittal, Anushka Roy, Aryan Rana, Eshvarya Bhagwani, Gurbani Kaur and Dipneet Kaur under the guidance of Mr. Asad Ahmed and Mr. Nachiketa Singh.
 ETRAM – The Western dance society
 Swarang – the music society.
 Acrostic – poetry society. This was founded in 2012 by three students Niyati, Shakti and Malini under convenorship of Novy Kapadia and held its maiden poetry recitation event in October 2012 with poets, professors and students of various colleges of Delhi University in attendance.
 Pinhole – photography society. This was founded in the academic year 2012–13, and held its first successful exhibition in October, where they showcased works of the society members.
 DADS – debate and discussion society.
 Anhad – divinity society
 Environmental Club
 Vigour – Bhangra and Gidha society
 Renaissance – fashion society; deactivated
 Trendsetterz – choreography and dance society. The first president of the society, Shaily Tandon, led the choreography team. 
 Strokes – fine arts society
 Ankur – Dramatics society
Teghpreneurs - The Entrepreneurship and Development Cell
 Finsworry

Noted people

College principals
 G.S. Talib, 1951-1952
 Sachdev Singh, 1952-1954
 G.S. Mansukhani, 1954-1955
 Prof. Niranjan Singh, 1955-1957
 G.S. Bal, 1957-1971
 Gurdip Singh Randhawa, 1971-1992
 Udham Singh, 1988
 Tirath Singh, 1988-1995
 D.S. Claire, 1995-2005
 Jaswinder Singh, 2005–present

Notable alumni
 Saurabh Shukla, actor, director and scriptwriter
Aasif Sheikh, Indian Actor. 
 Rabbi Shergill, singer and musician
 Arvinder Singh Lovely: Minister of Education and Transportation, Delhi government
 Maninder Singh: former cricketer turned commentator
 Shyam Lal: former gymnast, represented India twice in Olympics; Arjuna winner
 Mohinder Amarnath, former cricketer

References

External links
 

Educational institutions established in 1951
Delhi University
1951 establishments in India